Arburg GmbH + Co KG (referred to as ARBURG) is a German machine manufacturing company. It is owned by the Hehl and Keinath families and, with its electric, hybrid and hydraulic plastic injection moulding machines, turnkey systems and its industrial additive manufacturing system, is among the industry leaders worldwide. With approximately 2,500 employees in Germany and a further 500 worldwide, Arburg serves sales markets for machines with clamping forces ranging from 125 to 6,500 kN.

The machines are used for plastic part production in industries such as automotive, communications and consumer electronics, medical technology, domestic appliances and packaging. In addition, modular robotic systems and peripheral devices are produced. Arburg is represented by fully owned organisations at 33 locations in 25 countries and by trading partners in more than 50 countries. The central production and administration site is Lossburg in the Northern Black Forest, while other German locations include the "Technology Centers" in Radevormwald and Rednitzhembach.

The globally operating Hehl Group recorded a consolidated turnover of 750 million euros in 2018. With its arburgGreenworld programme, the injection moulding manufacturer Arburg is committed to circular economy and to the sustainable use of resources. Arburg's name was added to the Lexikon der deutschen Weltmarktführer, a compendium of German global market leaders, in 2010.

Applications 
In addition to standard injection moulding processes, the company also offers special equipment for areas such as multi-component injection moulding, the processing of thermoset, elastomer and silicone (Liquid Silicone Rubber), gas and water injection moulding technology (GIT, WIT), foaming technology, overmoulding of inserts, PIM (Powder Injection Moulding including: Metal Injection Moulding and Ceramic Injection Moulding) as well as clean room technology. Moreover, Arburg has its own system for additive manufacturing (freeformer).

Milestones 
1923: Establishment of the Hehl family business
1956: Serial production of injection moulding machines begins
1960: Sale of the thousandth injection moulding machine
1961: Patent for the Allrounder principle, enabling up to ten different working positions on a single machine
1962: Development and production of the first two-colour machine
1982: First machine featuring a graphical user interface
1993: Introduction of the "Selogica" control system
2000: Inauguration of Arburg II, adding a further 36,000 square metres of floorspace to the production area, resulting in a total of 146,000 square metres
2006: Allrounder injection moulding machines with clamping forces up to 5,000 kN
2009: Inauguration of the new Arburg Customer Center
2012: Celebration of 60 years of training at Arburg with 1,500 trainees
2013: Presentation of the freeformer additive manufacturing system (ARBURG Plastic Freeforming)
2015: Senior partner Eugen Hehl is inducted into the "Plastics Hall of Fame"
2016: Inauguration of the new assembly hall in Lossburg – expansion to 165,000 square metres
2016: Presentation of the Allrounder 1120 H with a clamping force of 6,500 kN in a new design and with the new "Gestica" control system.
2018: Presentation of the largest freeformer 300-3X
2020: Inauguration of the new Arburg training centre

Awards (Selection) 
 2012 "Georg-Menges-Preis" for Herbert Kraibuehler
 2014 Reddot Design Award for the "freeformer" 3D printer
 2015 Eugen Hehl is inducted into the "Plastics Hall of Fame"
 2015 Baden-Wuerttemberg Competence Prize for Eugen Hehl
 2016 Leonardo da Vinci Award for the “freeformer” 3D printer
 2017 Industry 4.0 Prize
 2018 Triple award for Arburg’s training programme
 2018 iF Design Award for the "Allrounder 1120 H"
 2018 Reddot Design Award for the "Gestica" control system
 2019 Bosch Global Supplier Award
 2020 VDI medal of honour for Eugen Hehl

References 

    Arburg Homepage US English
Arburg building new US HQ in Connecticut
Deep history, stability push Arburg forward

External links 
History and company website
Company website

Tool manufacturing companies of Germany
German brands
Companies based in Baden-Württemberg